Arbëresh (also known as Arbërisht, Arbreshi, Arbërishtja or Tarbrisht) is the variety of Albanian spoken by the Arbëreshë people of Italy. It is derived from the Albanian Tosk spoken in Albania, in Epirus and is also spoken by the Arvanites, with endonym Arvanitika.

History

Between the 11th and 14th centuries, Albanian-speaking mercenaries from the areas of Albania, Epirus and now Greece, were often recruited by the Franks, Aragonese, Italians and Byzantines.

The invasion of the Balkans by the Ottoman Turks in the 15th century caused large waves of emigration from the Balkans to southern Italy. In 1448, the King of Naples, Alfonso V of Aragon, asked the Albanian noble Skanderbeg to transfer to his service ethnic Albanian mercenaries. Led by Demetrio Reres and his two sons, these men and their families were settled in twelve villages in the Catanzaro area of Calabria. The following year, some of their relatives and other Albanians were settled in four villages in Sicily. In 1459  Ferdinand I of Naples also requested assistance from Skanderbeg. After victories in two battles, a second contingent of Albanians was rewarded with land east of Taranto, in Apulia, where they founded 15 villages. After the death of Skanderbeg (1468), resistance to the Ottomans in Albania came to an end. Subsequently, many Albanians fled to neighbouring countries and some settled in villages in Calabria.

There was a constant flow of ethnic Albanians into Italy into the 16th century, and other Albanian villages were formed on Italian soil. The new immigrants often took up work as mercenaries with Italian armies. For instance, between 1500 and 1534, Albanians from central Greece were employed as mercenaries by Venice, to evacuate its colonies in the Peloponnese, as the Turks invaded. Afterwards these troops reinforced defences in southern Italy against the threat of Turkish invasion. They established self-contained communities, which enabled their distinct language and culture to flourish. Arbëreshë, as they became known, were often soldiers for the Kingdom of Naples and the Republic of Venice, between the 16th and 19th centuries.

Despite an Arbëreshë cultural and artistic revival in the 19th century, emigration from southern Italy significantly reduced the population. In particular, migration to the Americas between 1900 and 1940 caused the total depopulation of approximately half of the Arbëreshë villages. The speech community forms part of the highly heterogenous linguistic landscape of Italy, with 12 recognised linguistic minorities Italian state law (law 482/1999). These languages are: Albanian, Catalan, German, Greek, Slovene and Croatian well as the minorities speaking French, Franco-Provençal, Friulian, Ladino, Occitan and Sardinian. The exact Arbëresh speech population is uncertain, as the Italian national census does not collect data on minority language speakers. This is also further complicated by the Italian state’s protection of the Albanian culture and population. This law theoretically implements specific measures in various fields such as education, communication, radio, press and TV public service, but in the case of the Arberesh community the legal construction of the language as “Albanian” and the community as the “Albanian population” effectively homogenises the language and has not led to adequate provision for the linguistic needs of the communities. This law also contrasts sharply with the 31 languages of Italy recognised by UNESCO, which also lists Arberesh as definitely endangered.

Classification
Arbëresh derives from a medieval variety of Tosk, which was spoken in southern Albania and from which the modern Tosk is also derived. It follows a similar evolutionary pattern to Arvanitika, a similar language spoken in Greece. Arbëresh is spoken in Southern Italy in the regions of Abruzzi, Basilicata, Calabria, Campania, Molise, Apulia and Sicily. The varieties of Arbëresh are closely related to each other but are not always entirely mutually intelligible.

Arbëresh retains many features of medieval Albanian from the time before the Ottoman invasion of Albania in the 15th century. It also retains some Greek elements, including vocabulary and pronunciation, most of which it shares with its relative Arvanitika. Many of the conservative features of Arbëresh were lost in mainstream Albanian Tosk. For example, it has preserved certain syllable-initial consonant clusters which have been simplified in Standard Albanian (cf. Arbëresh   ('language/tongue'), vs. Standard Albanian  ). Arbëresh most resembles the dialect of Albanian spoken in the south-central region of Albania, and also that of Çam Albanians.

Arbëresh was commonly called 'Albanese' ('Albanian' in the Italian language) in Italy until the 1990s. Arbëresh speakers used to have only very vague notions about how related or unrelated their language was to Albanian. Until the 1980s Arbëresh was exclusively a spoken language, except for its written form used in the Italo-Albanian Byzantine Church, and Arbëreshë people had no practical connection with the Standard Albanian language used in Albania, as they did not use this form in writing or in media. When a large number of immigrants from Albania began to enter Italy in the 1990s and came into contact with local Arbëreshë communities, the differences and similarities were for the first time made apparent. 

Since the 1980s, some efforts have been organized to preserve the cultural and linguistic heritage of the language.

Arbëresh has been replaced by local Romance languages and by Italian in several villages, and in others is experiencing contact-induced language shift. Gaetano Gerbino wrote  (Arbëresh dictionary). Other authors include Matteo Mandalà, and Zef Chiaramonte. The only book written in English for the U.S. and U.K. Arbëresh diaspora is Everyday Arberesh by Martin H. Di Maggio (2013).

Language or dialect
In Italy, "dialects" are not actual dialects as they do not derive from the politically dominant language and are therefore not one of its varieties, but they evolved in a separate and parallel way. In English, the term dialect generally refers to a form of a national language from which the variety is derived; thus it is certainly not the case that Arberesh derived from the national language of Albania, as that variety was standardised in the mid-twentieth century, and Arberesh evolved separately from other forms of Albanian since the 13th century when its first speakers emigrated to Morea from central Albania. A dialect is also defined linguistically as closely related and, despite their differences, by mutual intelligibility. In the absence of rigorous linguistic intelligibility tests, the claim cannot be made that Arberesh and Albanian are mutually intelligible, and thus this criterion cannot be used to define the former as a dialect of the latter. Furthermore, the views of its speakers are an important criterion, and to date there have been several studies whereby Arberesh speakers define their language as a language -and not as a dialect- and have resisted moves to implement Standard Albanian language as a language of instruction in their communities.

Varieties 

The varieties of Arbëresh largely correspond with the regions where they are spoken, while some settlements have distinctive features that result in greater or lesser degrees of mutual intelligibility.

The Siculo-Arbëresh variety is spoken exclusively in the Province of Palermo and in three villages: Piana degli Albanesi, Santa Cristina Gela and Contessa Entellina; while the varieties of Piana and Santa Cristina Gela are similar enough to be entirely mutually intelligible, the variety of Contessa Entellina is not entirely intelligible. Therefore a further dialect within Siculo-Arbëresh known as the Palermitan-Arbëresh variety can be identified, as well as a Cosenza variety, a Basilicata variety, and a Campania variety represented by the speech of one single settlement of Greci. There is also a Molisan-Arbëresh and an Apulio-Arbëresh.

Within the Cosenza Calabrian varieties of Arbëresh, the dialect of Vaccarizzo Albanese is particularly distinct. Spoken in the villages of Vaccarizzo Albanese and San Giorgio Albanese in Calabria by approximately 3,000 people, Vaccarizzo Albanian has retained many archaic features of both Gheg and Tosk dialects.

Phonology 

Some features of Arbëresh distinguish it considerably from standard Albanian. In some cases these are retentions of older pronunciations.

Vowels 
Ë

The letter  is pronounced as either a mid central vowel  or as a close back unrounded vowel . So the word  is pronounced either  or  depending on the dialect.

Y to I

Arbëresh lacks the close front rounded vowel  of Albanian, which is replaced by the close front unrounded vowel .

Consonants 

GJ, Q

GL, KL

In Standard Albanian these have mostly become the palatal stops gj and q, e.g.  not  ('s/he looks like ...

H, HJ

The letter  is pronounced as a voiceless velar fricative  (a sound also found in Greek:  , 'joy'). As such, the Albanian word  ('eat') is pronounced , not . Arbëresh additionally has the palatalized counterpart, . Therefore, the word  ('throw') is pronounced . The letter combination  is present in a few standard Albanian words (without a voiceless velar fricative), but is not treated as a separate letter of the alphabet as it is in Arbëresh.

LL, G

The vast majority of these words originate in Sicilian, but the sound also occurs in words of Albanian origin. In the first example, the  becomes   because it comes from Sicilian, whereas in the process of transference from the Italian  to Arbëresh , the  does not change but the  becomes .

Final devoicing of consonants 
In contrast with standard Albanian, Arbëresh has retained an archaic system of final devoicing of consonants. The consonants that change when in final position or before another consonant are the voiced stops b, d, g, gj; the voiced affricates x, xh; and the voiced fricatives dh, ll, v, z, zh.

Examples:
 b > p: thelb ('clove') - 
 d > t: vend ('place') - 
 dh > th: zgledh ('read') - 
 g > k: lig ('bad') - 
 gj > q: zogj ('chicks') - 
 j > hj: vaj ('oil') - 
 ll > h: uthull ('vinegar') - 
 x > c: ndanx ('near') - 
 z > s: loz ('dance') - 
 zh > sh: gozhda ('pin') -

Stress 
Stress in Arbëresh is usually on the penultimate syllable, as in Italian.

Morphology 
In Arbëresh the first person present indicative (e.g. "I work") is marked by the word ending in NJ, whereas in Albanian this is normally marked by J. So, 'I live' is rrónj in Arbëresh and rroj in standard Albanian.
The present continuous or gerund differs from Standard Albanian; Arbëresh uses the form "jam'e bënj" instead of "po bej" (I am doing).

Non-Albanian derived elements

Vocabulary 
The adoption of words of ancient Greek origin or of the Koine comes above all from their use in Byzantine religious practices, when the corresponding use in Albanian declined, the "courtly" one of the church was used. The Arberesh use ancient Greek in their liturgies. Thus synonyms are created, such as parkales or lutje for the word "prayer".

Some Arbëresh words appear to be of Koine Greek influence. Examples:

amáhj  ('war') <   ('battle').
haristís   ('thank') <   ('thank you'). Arvanitika uses fharistisem.
hora  ('village') <   ('land, village')
hiravol (sheaf, a bundle of harvested crop), < χειρόβολο (χειρ = hand).

Some Arbëresh words appear to be of Albanian Arvanitika which has influenced the current Greek areas since the Middle Ages. Examples:

dhomat (bundle, pack), < Gr. δεμάτιον.
argomē (fallow, plowing), < όργωμα. Today surviving in the toponym Argomazit of Piana dei Albanesi.
kalogreshza (little woman monk), < καλόγρια = woman monk.
gjitonia (neighbourhood), < γειτονία.
dhaskal (teacher), < δάσκαλος.

On the Koine Greek elements in the Italo-Albanian dialects see T. Jochalas (1975).

Archaic Latin-Sicilianisms 
In the Arbëresh varieties of Sicily and Calabria there are loanwords from the Sicilian language that have crystallized into the Arberesh language matrix at some time in the past but have now mostly disappeared, or evolved in the romance vocabulary of the local population. This also occurs in other Arberesh varieties outside of Sicily with the local Romance varieties of their communities.

Examples:

ghranet ('money') <  Sic. granna, meaning 'grains'. It is still used in some contexts by modern Sicilian speakers, but in all situations in Arbëresh. Another Arbëresh word for 'money' is haromë, but is no longer used.
qaca ('square') < Sic. chiazza; used in all Arbëresh dialects as well as Sicilian. The Albanian word sheshi which means 'square' in standard Albanian means 'plateau' in Arbëresh.
rritrenjet ('toilets') < Norman French via Sic. retained in Arbëresh, but no longer in use in modern Sicilian.
rritrat ('photograph') < Sic. 'picture' (ritrattu), more common in Arbëresh than in modern Sicilian.
zdar (to go to the countryside) < Sic. sdari; no longer commonly used in Sicilian.
zgarrar (to make a mistake; to err) < Sic. sgarrari (now carries a different meaning in Sicilian).

Incorporation 
Alongside the Sicilian vocabulary element in Siculo-Arbëresh, the language also includes grammatical rules for the incorporation of Sicilian-derived verbs in Arbëresh, which differs from the rules concerning Albanian lexical material.

Examples:

 pincar ('think'), originally mendonj – mbanj mend but also mëndinj; derived from the Sicilian 'pinzari'. Which conjugates in the present tense as follows:
 U pincar = I think
 Ti pincar = You think
 Ai/Ajo pincar = He/She thinks
 Na pincarjëm = We think
 Ju pincarni = You (pl) think
 Ata/Ato pincarjën = They think

In the past tense this conjugates as follows:

 U pincarta = I thought
 Ti pincarte = You thought
 Ai/Ajo pincarti = He/She thought
 Na pincartëm = We thought
 Ju pincartët = You (pl.) thought
 Ata/Ato pincartën = They thought

Contractions

Diminutives and augmentatives 

The Arbëresh diminutive and augmentative system is calqued from Sicilian and takes the form of /-ats(-ɛ)/ = Sic. -azz(u/a); for example "kalac" (cavallone/big horse), and the diminutive takes the form of /-tʃ-ɛl(-ɛ) from Sic. /-c-edd(u/a); for example "vajziçele" (raggazzina/little girl).The Arbëresh word for "swear word" is "fjalac" and comes from a fusion of the Arbëresh word of Albanian etymology: "fjalë" plus the Sicilian augmentative /-azz[a]/ minus the feminine gendered ending /-a/; this calques the Sicilian word 'palurazza' which is cognate with Italian 'parolaccia'.

Comparison with other forms of Albanian
There are many instances in which Arberisht differs greatly from Standard Albanian, for instance:

Grammar comparison 

There are many elements of Arberesh grammar that differ considerably from Albanian, for example:

Name 

The name Arbërishte is derived from the ethnonym "Albanoi",  which in turn comes from the toponym "Arbëria" (Greek: Άρβανα), which in the Middle Ages referred to a region in what is today Albania (Babiniotis 1998). Its native equivalents (Arbërorë, Arbëreshë and others) used to be the self-designation of Albanians in general. Both "Arbëria" and "Albania/Albanian" go further back to name forms attested since antiquity.

Within the Arbëresh community the language is often referred to as "Tarbrisht" or "Gjegje." The origin of the term "gjegje" is uncertain, however this does mean "listen" in Arbërisht. Gheg is also the name of one of the two major dialects of Albanian as spoken in the Balkans. The name Gheg is derived from the term initially used by the Orthodox Christian population of pre-Ottoman Albania for confessional denotation when referring to their Catholic neighbors who converted to Catholicism to better resist the Orthodox Serbs.

Arbëresh names 
Every Italo-Albanian person is given a legal Italian name and also a name in Albanian Arbërisht. Quite often the Arbëresh name is merely a translation of the Italian name. Arbëresh surnames are also used amongst villagers but do not carry any legal weight; the Arbëresh surname is called an "ofiqe" in Arbërisht. Some Arbëresh 'ofiqe' are 'Butijuni', 'Pafundi', 'Skarpari' (shoemaker from Italian word 'scarpa').

Examples of Italian names and their Arbëresh equivalents:

Writing system 
The language is not usually written outside of the church and a few highly educated families, but officials are now using the standard Albanian alphabet, which is used on street signs in villages as well as being taught in schools.

Language samples

Pronouns

Verbs 

Arbëresh verbs often differ, somewhat drastically, from their Standard Albanian counterparts.

Some common phrases

Prepositions

Demonstrative pronouns

Demonstrative pronouns replace nouns once they are able to be understood from their context.

Sample text 

Shërbesa e Kurorës - The Arbëresh Marriage Ceremony

Zoti : Gjergji, do ti të marsh për gruja Linën çë ë ke këtú te ana, si urdhuron Klisha Shejte, e të qëndrosh lidhur me atë në të mirën si edhé në të ligën gjithë ditët e gjellës tënde?

Priest: Do you George want to take as your wife Lina who is present here according to the instructions of the Holy Church and to be faithful through the good and the bad all of your life?

Dhëndërri: O, e dua!

Groom: Yes, I want!

Zoti: Bekuar kloft Perëndia jínë nga herë, naní e për gjithëmonë e për jetë të jetëvet.

Priest: blessed be our God for all time, now and always in the centuries of centuries.

Populli: Amín.

People: Amen.

Zoti: Në paqe parkalesjëm t'ën Zonë.

Priest: In peace we pray to the Lord.

Populli: Lipisí, o i Madh'yn'Zot.

People: Our Great God, we beseech you.

Bekimi të unazavet

Zoti: Me këtë unazë shërbëtori i Perëndis, Gjergji, lidhet me shërbëtorën e Perëndis, Lina, në embër të Atit, të Birit e të Shpirtit Shejt.

Priest: The servant of God, George, is tied to the servant of God, Lina, in the name of the Father, the Son, and the Holy Spirit.

Zoti jep krinjët e këndon Msalmin 127:
Të limë atá çë i trëmben t'ynë Zoti e çë jecjën te udhët e Tij.

the priest delivers the candles and intones Psalm 127
Make happy those who fear the Lord and may they walk in His ways.

Lëvdi tij, o i madh'yn'Zot, lëvdi tij. Dhóksa si, o Theós imón, dhóksa si
Glory to you, our God, glory to you.

Se ti ka hashë bukën e shërbëtyrës s'duarvet tote. Lumë ti e fatbardhë ka jeshë. Jotë shoqe ka jet si dhri me pemë te muret e shpis tënde. Bijët tatë si degë ullinjësh rrethë triesës tënde. Shi kështú ka jet bekuar njeriu çë ka trëmbësirën e Perëndisë.

That you will eat the bread of the work of your hands. You will be happy and enjoy all that is good.
See your wife as a fertile vine in the intimacy of your home.
That your daughters will be like olive branches around your table.
That those who fear the Lord will be blessed.

Swadesh list (comparative list)

Footnotes

References 
Babiniotis, Georgios (1985): Συνοπτική Ιστορία της ελληνικής γλώσσας με εισαγωγή στην ιστορικοσυγκριτική γλωσσολογία. ["A concise history of the Greek language, with an introduction to historical-comparative linguistics] Athens: Ellinika Grammata.
Babiniotis, Georgios (1998), Λεξικό της Νέας Ελληνικής Γλώσσας ["Dictionary of Modern Greek"]. Athens: Kentro Lexikologias.
Breu,  Walter (1990): "Sprachliche Minderheiten in Italien und Griechenland." ["Linguistic minorities in Italy and Greece"]. In: B. Spillner (ed.), Interkulturelle Kommunikation. Frankfurt: Lang. 169-170.
GHM (=Greek Helsinki Monitor) (1995): "Report: The Arvanites". Online report
Hammarström, Harald (2005): Review of Ethnologue: Languages of the World, 15th Edition. LINGUIST List 16.2637 (5 Sept 2005). Online article  Vol. II. Livadia: Exandas, 1999 PDF.Η Καινή Διαθήκη στα Αρβανίτικα: Διάτα ε Ρε ['The New Testament in Arvanitika']. Athens: Ekdoseis Gerou. No date.
Kloss, Heinz (1967): "Abstand-languages and Ausbau-languages". Anthropological linguistics 9.
Salminen, Tapani (1993–1999): Unesco Red Book on Endangered Languages: Europe. .
Strauss, Dietrich (1978): "Scots is not alone: Further comparative considerations". Actes du 2e Colloque de langue et de littérature écossaises Strasbourg 1978. 80-97.
Thomason, Sarah G. (2001): Language contact: An introduction. Washington: Georgetown University Press. Online chapter
Trudgill, Peter (2004): "Glocalisation [sic] and the Ausbau sociolinguistics of modern Europe". In: A. Duszak, U. Okulska (eds.), Speaking from the margin: Global English from a European perspective''. Frankfurt: Peter Lang. Online article

External links 

 

Arbëreshë culture
Endangered Indo-European languages
Endangered diaspora languages
False friends
Languages of Campania
Languages of Calabria
Languages of Sicily
Languages of Molise
Albanian dialects
Languages of Abruzzo